"Vivir" (Live) is the fourth single of Belinda's debut studio album Belinda.

Information 
The song served as the theme for the telenovela Corazones al límite (in which she would also act for a short time), and quickly gained airplay in the charts. The acoustic version was included on the CD soundtrack from Corazones al límite. The song received a nomination for Best Musical Theme at the 2005 TVyNovelas Awards.

Track list 
Mexican CD Single/Promo
 Vivir
 Vivir (Acoustic Version)

Music video 
The music video was directed by Alejandro Lozano and released in September 2004.
The video shows a couple sleeping. Then Belinda comes to the couple's room and puts wires of guitars and microphones in 2 speakers. While she is singing,a lot of things like a vase fall into the floor and break.

Awards

Kalomoira cover 
The Greek-American singer Kalomoira recorded the song in 2004, under the name "Someday", for her self-titled debut studio album.

References

External links 
 

2004 singles
Belinda Peregrín songs
Spanish-language songs
Songs written by Tommy Tysper
2003 songs
Songs written by Belinda Peregrín
Songs written by Marcus Sepehrmanesh
Song recordings produced by Mauri Stern

pt:Belinda Peregrín#Discografia